Commodore Porter may refer to:

David Porter (naval officer) (1780–1843), U.S. Navy commodore
William D. Porter (1808–1864), U.S. Navy commodore

See also
David Dixon Porter (1813–1891), U.S. Navy admiral
Henry Porter (Canadian admiral) (1922–2016), Royal Canadian Navy vice admiral